Wyoming Township may refer to one of the following places in the United States:

 Wyoming Township, Lee County, Illinois
 Wyoming Township, Jones County, Iowa
 Wyoming, Michigan (formerly Wyoming Township, Michigan)
 Wyoming Township, Chisago County, Minnesota
 Wyoming Township, Holt County, Nebraska

See also

Wyoming (disambiguation)

Township name disambiguation pages